The Wagram was a first-rate 118-gun ship of the line of the French Navy, of the Océan type, designed by Jacques-Noël Sané.

Begun as Monarque, she was commissioned as Wagram in Toulon on 15 June 1810 under Captain Baudin. Under Captain François Legras, she took part in the action of 5 November 1813 as the flagship of Rear-Admiral Cosmao.

29 August 1814, after the Hundred Days, she was transferred from Toulon to Brest, along with Austerlitz and Commerce de Paris.

She was eventually struck and broken up on 1836.

References

 A propos du 118 canons le Wagram Nicolas Mioque

Ships of the line of the French Navy
Océan-class ships of the line
1810 ships